Marcelo Demoliner and Rodrigo Guidolin were the defenders of championship title, but they lost to Ricardo Hocevar and Caio Zampieri in the first round. 
Franco Ferreiro and André Sá were champions after beating André Ghem and Simone Vagnozzi in two sets (6–4, 6–3).

Seeds

Draw

Draw

References
 Doubles Draw

Aberto Santa Catarina de Tenis - Doubles
2010 Doubles